Voyager is the 17th music album by Mike Oldfield, released in 1996 by Warner Music UK. It is a Celtic-themed album with new compositions intertwined with traditional pieces.

Background 
The album was the last in the original three album deal which Oldfield had signed with Warner after leaving Virgin, starting with Tubular Bells II. Oldfield would stay with Warner until 2003, where his final album for the label was Tubular Bells 2003.

In an interview from the time, Oldfield claimed that the album was one of his quickest to create, only taking a month and a half to record, also claiming that he composed and recorded some songs in one morning.

Celtic music 
The music on this album is the most overtly Celtic music Mike Oldfield has produced. The album was originally recorded using only acoustic hand-played instruments. After the daughter of a Warner Music exec said it sounded boring, Oldfield added synthesizers and more instruments to the album.

"The Hero" is a Scottish piece originally written by James Scott Skinner in 1903, as "Hector the Hero". "She Moves Through the Fair" is a traditional Irish song, the melody of which had been used by Simple Minds for "Belfast Child" in 1989. "Women of Ireland", although credited as a traditional song, is not: the main theme is a melody written by Irish composer Seán Ó Riada as a musical setting of the poem "Mná na hÉireann", written by Peadar Ó Doirnín; Oldfield's rendition also includes an interpolation of the fourth movement (Sarabande) of George Frideric Handel's Keyboard suite in D minor, popularised by its use by Stanley Kubrick in his 1975 film Barry Lyndon, where Ó Riada's tune also appears (Oldfield's "Women of Ireland" was reportedly inspired by the coupling of both pieces in the film).  "Dark Island" is a Scottish instrumental and song; the original music was written by Iain Maclachlan as Dr. Mackay's Farewell to Creagorry in 1958.  Later used as the theme to a 1962 BBC TV series and re-titled for the series. A set of words were later written by David Silver in 1963. Another well known set of words were also set to a variation of the tune in 1963, by Stewart Ross.  "Flowers of the Forest" is a traditional Scottish song, a lament for the defeat at Flodden in 1513. "The Song of the Sun" is composed by Bieito Romero from Celtic band Luar na Lubre. Its original title is "O son do ar" ("The sound of the air").

"Mont Saint-Michel", a piece on the album composed by Oldfield, refers to a tidal island in France.

Singles 

Promotional singles for "The Voyager" and "The Song of the Sun", in Germany and Spain respectively, were released in 1996. Mike Oldfield's rendition of "Women of Ireland" was released as a single in 1997.

Other artists samples 
The song "Celtic Rain" was sampled in 2008 by Snoop Dogg, in the song "Why Did You Leave Me" of the album Ego Trippin'. The song was produced by Polow da Don.

Track listing 
 "The Song of the Sun" (Bieito Romero) – 4:32
 "Celtic Rain" (Mike Oldfield) – 4:41
 "The Hero" (Traditional; arranged by Oldfield) – 5:03
 "Women of Ireland" (Traditional; arranged by Oldfield) – 6:29
 "The Voyager" (Oldfield) – 4:26
 "She Moves Through the Fair" (Traditional; arranged by Oldfield) – 4:06
 "Dark Island" (Traditional; arranged by Oldfield) – 5:43
 "Wild Goose Flaps Its Wings" (Oldfield) – 5:04
 "Flowers of the Forest" (Traditional; arranged by Oldfield) – 6:03
 "Mont St Michel" (Oldfield) – 12:18

Charts 
The album charted highest in Hungary at number 1, but also charted around Europe.

Certifications and sales

Personnel 
 Mike Oldfield - guitar
 Máire Breatnach – fiddle 
 London Voices – choir vocals 
 Noel Eccles – percussion 
 Liam O'Flynn – Uilleann pipes 
 Chris Apps, Roger Huth, Ian Macey, Bob MacIntosh - Highland pipers
 Seán Keane – fiddle 
 London Symphony Orchestra  
 Matt Molloy – flutes, tin whistles 
 John Myers – tin whistle, fiddle 
 David Spillane – Uilleann pipes, low whistle 
 Pat Walsh - additional music  
 Robin Smith – musical arrangement (track 10), music conductor (10) 
 Henry Jackman – additional music programming
Technical
 Gregg Jackman – assistant engineer
 Tom Newman – assistant engineer
 Richard Barrie – technical engineer

References

External links 
 Mike Oldfield Discography – Voyager at Tubular.net
 "Dark Island" lyrics at Tubular.net

Mike Oldfield albums
1996 albums
Warner Music Group albums
Reprise Records albums